Eussoia is a genus of minute operculate snails, marine gastropod mollusks or micromollusks in the family Assimineidae.

Species
Species within the genus Eussoia include:

 Eussoia leptodonta Nevill, 1881

References

External links

Assimineidae
Monotypic gastropod genera